This article lists players who have captained the senior Armagh county football team in the Ulster Senior Football Championship and the All-Ireland Senior Football Championship. The captain, unlike some other counties, is not necessarily chosen from the club that has won the Armagh Senior Football Championship.

List of captains

+Captains
Gaelic football
Armagh